Fredericka is a given name and may refer to:

 Fredericka Douglass Sprague Perry (1872-1943), American philanthropist and activist
 Fredericka Mandelbaum (1818–1894), New York entrepreneur and criminal fence operator
 Fredericka of Saxe-Gotha-Altenburg (1715-1775), German noblewoman and member of the House of Wettin
 Fredericka Elisabeth of Saxe-Eisenach (1669-1730),  German noblewoman and member of the House of Wettin

See also
 Frederica (disambiguation)
 Freddy and Fredericka, 2005 satiric novel by Mark Helprin